The 2019 Orange County SC season is the club's ninth season of existence, and their ninth consecutive season in the United Soccer League Championship, the second tier of American soccer. Orange County will also compete in the U.S. Open Cup.

Orange County struggled in the opening weeks, going winless through the first four weeks (0-2-2), and capturing only four wins in the first 17 games (4-6-7). Competitive success was inconsistent until a victory over Reno 1868 FC in week 21, when OCSC then went on to gather ten wins in 14 games, including a 6-game win streak.  OCSC finished 5th in the Western Conference in the regular season with 54 points, two points behind Real Monarchs SLC.  Orange County travelled to Zion's Bank Stadium for the first round quarterfinal playoff game and lost to the host Monarchs 2–6. In the U.S. Open Cup, Orange County were eliminated in the first round by Orange County FC losing 3–5 on penalties, failing to win a game in the competition for the fifth time in club history.

2019 marked the second season with Braeden Cloutier as the club's head coach, and the first season with former player Richard Chaplow as assistant coach.  The season average of 3,192 fans per home match was the largest average in club history, and the third consecutive season that the average attendance had increased.

Current roster

Technical Staff

Competitions

Exhibitions
All times in Pacific Time

USL Championship

Standings

Results summary

Results by round

Match results
On December 19, 2018, the USL announced their 2019 season schedule.

All times in Pacific Time

USL Cup Playoffs

U.S. Open Cup

As a member of the USL Championship, Orange County SC will enter the tournament in the Second Round, to be played May 14–15, 2019

Home Attendance

References

Orange County SC seasons
Orange County SC
Orange County SC
Orange County SC